Radio DDR 2  was a radio channel in East Germany run by Rundfunk der DDR, created in October 1958. It was a regional service in the morning and at 01:00 local time, broadcast centralized classical music and radio plays produced in Berlin. Since this was a regional service, it used mostly FM broadcasting, with some minor AM broadcasting repeaters near Senftenberg.

References
 http://www.kalter-krieg-im-radio.de/index.php?et=6&er=28
 https://web.archive.org/web/20100228172427/http://www1.mdr.de/damals/lexikon/1516530.html
 http://www.kalter-krieg-im-radio.de/index.php?et=6&er=28

Defunct radio stations in East Germany
Radio stations established in 1958
Radio stations disestablished in 1990
1958 establishments in East Germany
1990 disestablishments in East Germany
Mass media in Berlin